Little Wills Creek is a  tributary of Wills Creek in Bedford County, Pennsylvania, in the United States.

Little Wills Creek begins south of Pennsylvania Route 31. It flows down a valley between the Allegheny Front and Wills Mountain, drawing most of its water from the Allegheny Plateau, and enters Wills Creek just below Hyndman. Tributaries include Wolf Camp Run, Tar Water Creek, Mill Run, Grim Run, and Tiger Run.

See also
List of rivers of Pennsylvania

References

Rivers of Bedford County, Pennsylvania
Tributaries of the Potomac River
Allegheny Plateau
Rivers of Pennsylvania